The Rudra Mahalaya Temple, also known as Rudramal, is a destroyed/desecrated Hindu temple complex at Siddhpur in the Patan district of Gujarat, India. Its construction was started in 943 AD by Mularaja and completed in 1140 AD by Jayasimha Siddharaja, a ruler of the Chaulukya dynasty. The Hindu temple was destroyed by the Sultan of Delhi, Alauddin Khalji, and later the Sultan of Gujarat, Ahmed Shah I (1410–1444) desecrated and substantially demolished the temple, and also converted part of it into the congregational mosque (Jami Masjid) of the city. Two torans (porches) and four pillars of the former central structure still stand along with the western part of the complex used as a congregational mosque.

History

Sidhpur, under the rulers of Chaulukya dynasty, was a prominent town in the tenth century. An inscription from 986-987 CE mentions in passing that Mularaja, the founder of the Chaulukya dynasty of Gujarat, had offered prayers to Rudra Mahalay. Colonial sources say that Muladev ordered the construction of a shrine there to atone for his earlier sins, but it is possible that a temple existed at the place even before his reign. Archaeological evidence suggests that an existing structure was removed and a new complex was built on top of the existing foundation in twelfth century.

Consecration 
It was during the 12th century, in 1140 AD, that Jayasimha Siddharaja (1094–1144) consecrated the temple complex in worship of Shiva. This act continued the long-running patronage of the city by the Chalukyas.

Dismantling 
The temple was dismantled during the siege of the city by Ahmad Shah I (1410–44) of Muzaffarid dynasty; parts of it were reused in setting up a new congregational mosque. Mirat-i-Sikandiri, the earliest extant chronicle in Persian documenting Shah's campaigns, attributes the destruction to religious zealotry — however, Alka Patel cautions that these texts were often biased due to panegyric aims and often contradicted by other evidence.

Architecture
The temple was built in Māru-Gurjara architecture style.

Gallery

See also

List of Monuments of National Importance in Gujarat

Notes

References

Bibliography

Hindu temples in Gujarat
Shiva temples in Gujarat
Destroyed temples
Religious buildings and structures converted into mosques
Monuments of National Importance in Gujarat
Māru-Gurjara architecture
Siddhpur